Kevin Robertson (born May 25, 1971) is a Canadian Anglican bishop.

Education

Robertson was educated at Holy Trinity School, Richmond Hill, Huron University College and Trinity College, Toronto and ordained in 1997.

Ordained ministry
Robertson served as assistant curate of St. Philip on-the-Hill, Unionville in 1997 and then at the Cathedral Church of St. James, Toronto from 1997 to 2000. He held three incumbencies: St. Peter, Oshawa (2000-2005), St. Nicholas, Birch Cliff (2005-2011), and Christ Church Deer Park (2011-2016).

Episcopal ministry
Robertson was elected on 17 September 2016, and consecrated on January 7, 2017. He is responsible for 55 parishes in the York Scarborough section of the Diocese of Toronto.

Marriage
In late December 2018, the Diocese of Toronto issued a congratulation to Bishop Kevin Robertson and Mr. Mohan Sharma, who were married at St. James Cathedral. The report stated that:"Bishop Kevin and Mohan, who have been a couple since 2009, had their relationship blessed in 2016 according to the Pastoral Guidelines of the Diocese of Toronto and are now married under the marriage provision of the same guidelines."

References

External links
 Installation as Bishop

1971 births
21st-century Anglican Church of Canada bishops
Anglican bishops of Toronto
Living people
LGBT Anglican bishops
People from Richmond Hill, Ontario
Trinity College (Canada) alumni
21st-century Canadian LGBT people
Canadian gay men